Adamson Associates is a Toronto-based architectural firm founded in 1934.

Gordon Sinclair Adamson (1904-1986) started the firm in 1934 after working for a number of other architects (F. Hilton Wilkes and Edwin Kay), as well as noted Henry Sproatt and Ernest Ross Rolph. He worked briefly with Earle Morgan, but most of his practice was on his own or with associates. His practice was mainly residential, commercial or industrial clients in Ontario.

Adamson's firm employed another Toronto architect John B. Parkin and Adamson retired and left the firm in 1971.

The firm operated as G.S. Adamson, briefly as Adamson and Morgan in the 1940s, then as Gordon S. Adamson & Associates and renamed Adamson Associates since.

The firm's main offices in Toronto are located at 401 Wellington Street West, formerly McGregor Socks factory.

Projects

Adamson entered into the contest to design the new Toronto City Hall in 1958.

Since his departure the firm has been involved in other projects in Canada and overseas:

 Royal York Collegiate Institute/Etobicoke School of the Arts, Etobicoke, 1952-1953
 Alderwood Collegiate Institute, Etobicoke, 1954-1955
 Thistletown Collegiate Institute, Etobicoke, 1956-1957
 Kipling Collegiate Institute, 1959-1960
 Kingsmill Secondary School/Bishop Allen Academy, Etobicoke, 1962-1963
 Sir John A. Macdonald Collegiate Institute, Scarborough, 1963-1964
 Humbergrove Secondary School/Father Henry Carr Catholic Secondary School, Etobicoke, 1965-1966
 Toronto Pearson International Airport New Terminal Development 2007 - with Airport Architects Canada (Skidmore, Owings and Merrill International Ltd and Moshe Safdie Associates Ltd.)
 The Shard at London Bridge, London 2013
 The National 9/11 Memorial Museum Entry Pavilion, New York City 2013 - with Snøhetta
 New Oakville Hospital 2015 - with Parkin Architects Limited
 Bay Park Centre 2020-2023 - with Wilkinson Eyre Architects
 Redevelopment of St. Lawrence Market North, Toronto 2010-2018 - with Rogers Stirk Harbour + Partners

References

External links
 Official site

Architecture firms of Canada
Companies based in Toronto
1934 establishments in Canada
Design companies established in 1934